Salvelinus willughbii, also known as the Windermere charr, is a cold-water fish in the family Salmonidae. Its binomial species name commemorates Francis Willughby. Willughby and John Ray had described this fish and its relatives in two Welsh lakes in 1662, recognising these charr as differing from other salmon-like species.

References

willughbii
Cold water fish
Fish described in 1852
Taxa named by Albert Günther